Fairy Tales is the only studio album by American contemporary R&B group Divine, released October 27, 1998 via Red Ant Records and Pendulum Records. The album peaked at #126 on the Billboard 200.

Two singles were released from Fairy Tales: "Lately" and a cover of George Michael's song "One More Try". "Lately" was the most successful single from the album, peaking at #1 on the Billboard Hot 100 in 1998.

Track listing

Charts

References

External links
 
 

1998 debut albums
Divine (group) albums
Pendulum Records albums